JC Davis may refer to:

J. C. Davis, a British historian
J.C. "Billy" Davis (born 1938), American guitarist, member of Hank Ballard & The Midnighters